Anna Belomyttseva (born November 24, 1996) is a Russian footballer who plays as a defender for Lokomotiv Moscow at the Russian Women's Football Championship.

Belomyttseva represented Russia at several youth levels, including the U17 and U19 national teams. She debuted with the Russian senior national team in 2016 and was in the 23-players squad that represented Russia at the UEFA Women's Euro 2017, although she didn't play any of the team's matches in the competition. After the tournament, she became an important part of the Russian team, featuring in several matches for the team.

International goals

References

External links
 
 
 

1996 births
Living people
Russia women's international footballers
Russian women's footballers
Women's association football defenders
Ryazan-VDV players
WFC Lokomotiv Moscow players
Altai people
Sportspeople from Altai Krai
Russian Women's Football Championship players
UEFA Women's Euro 2017 players
21st-century Russian women